William Paul Johnson (born February 16, 1959) is the Chief United States district judge of the United States District Court for the District of New Mexico.

Born in Roanoke, Virginia, Johnson was an Eagle Scout in the Boyscouts. He received a Bachelor of Arts degree in the economics from Virginia Military Institute in 1981 and a Juris Doctor from Washington and Lee University in 1985. He went to Fort Sill to become an artillery officer and served in the United States Army Reserve from 1981 to 1990. He achieved the rank of captain. He was in private practice in Houston, Texas, from 1985 to 1986. He was in private practice in Roswell, New Mexico, from 1986 to 1995. He was a judge on the state Fifth Judicial District Court from 1995 to 2001.

Johnson is a United States District Judge of the United States District Court for the District of New Mexico. Johnson was nominated by President George W. Bush on September 4, 2001, to a seat vacated by John Edwards Conway. He was confirmed by the United States Senate on December 13, 2001, and received his commission on December 21, 2001. He became Chief Judge on February 7, 2018, after Christina Armijo assumed senior status.

Sources

1959 births
Living people
Judges of the United States District Court for the District of New Mexico
New Mexico state court judges
Politicians from Roanoke, Virginia
United States district court judges appointed by George W. Bush
21st-century American judges
United States Army officers
Virginia Military Institute alumni
Washington and Lee University School of Law alumni